Trigenicus is an extinct genus of small artiodactyl in the family Protoceratidae, endemic to North America. Trigenicus resembled deer, but were more closely related to camelids.

Fossil distribution
Fossils have been recovered from: 
Toadstool Park, Chadron Formation, Sioux County, Nebraska
Peanut Peak, Chadron Formation, Oglala Lakota County, South Dakota
Little Spring Gulch, Cook Ranch Formation, Beaverhead County, Montana
Carnagh, Cypress Hills Formation, Saskatchewan

References 

Eocene even-toed ungulates
 
Eocene mammals of North America
Fossil taxa described in 1903
Prehistoric even-toed ungulate genera